

The Criel Mound, also known as the South Charleston Mound, is a Native American burial mound located in South Charleston, West Virginia. It is one of the few surviving mounds of the Kanawha Valley Mounds that were probably built in the Woodland period after 500 B.C.  The mound was built by the Adena culture, probably around 250–150 BC, and lay equidistant between two “sacred circles”, earthwork enclosures each  in diameter. (The Grave Creek Mound in Moundsville is the largest.) This archaeological site is listed on the National Register of Historic Places.

History
The mound was originally conical in shape.  Residents of the area leveled the top in 1840 to erect a judges' stand, as they ran horse races around the base of the mound at the time.

The Criel Mound was excavated in 1883–84 under the auspices of the US Bureau of Ethnology and the supervision of Col. P.W. Norris.  The excavation was performed by Professor Cyrus Thomas of the Smithsonian Institution.  Inside the mound, Professor Thomas found thirteen skeletons: two near the top of the mound, and eleven at the base.  The skeletons at the base consisted of a single very large but badly decayed skeleton at the center, a "once most powerful man" which according to A.R. Sines who assisted Col. Norris in the excavation, measured "Six feet, 8 3–4 inches" (205 cm) from head to heel (the Smithsonian nomination form added "but the extreme height indicated might have been an exaggeration created by earth pressing down on the burial"). This skeleton was surrounded by ten other skeletons arranged in a spoke-like pattern, with their feet pointing toward the central skeleton.  The skeletons at the base had been wrapped in elm bark and were lying on a floor of white ash and bark.  Several artifacts were found buried with the skeletons, including arrowheads, lanceheads, and shell and pottery fragments.  The central skeleton was accompanied by a fish-dart, a lance-head, and a sheet of hammered native copper near the head.  Holes found at the base of the mound suggest that the bodies at the base had been enclosed in a wooden vault.

Kanawha Valley Mounds
The Criel Mound is part of the second-largest known concentration of Adena mounds and circular enclosures which Cyrus Thomas called the "Kanawha Valley Mounds". This area extends for eight miles (13 km) along the upper terraces of the Kanawha River floodplain, in the vicinity of present-day Charleston. In 1894, Cyrus Thomas reported 50 mounds in this area, ranging from 3’ to 35’ in height and from 35’ to 200’ in diameter. Stone mounds dotted the bluffs above the floodplain.

While many of the original Adena mounds were destroyed during later development of the area, a few remain.  The Wilson Mound is in a private cemetery in South Charleston. A recreation of the original Shawnee Reservation Mound exists in Institute, West Virginia.

Staunton Park
Today, the Criel Mound is the centerpiece of Staunton Park, a small municipal park maintained by the city of South Charleston.  It is a gathering place for community activities, such as arts and crafts fairs, revivals, memorial services, sunrise services, and town carnivals.

See also
 Adena culture
 Mound builders
 Prehistory of West Virginia
 South Charleston, West Virginia

Notes

Further reading
 Dragoo, Don W. Mounds for the Dead.  315 pages. The Carnegie Museum of Natural History: 1963. .
 Silverberg, Robert. The Mound Builders.  276 pages. Ohio University Press: 1970. .
 Thomas, Cyrus “Report on Mound Explorations of the Bureau of Ethnology”; In: Powell, J.W. (1894), Twelfth Annual Report of the Bureau of Ethnology to the Secretary of the Smithsonian Institution, 1890–’91; Washington: Government Printing Office, pp 416–417. 
 Webb, Willam S., and Snow, Charles E. The Adena People. 369 pages. The University of Tennessee Press: 1974. .
 Woodward, Susan L., and McDonald, Jerry N. Indian Mounds of the Middle Ohio Valley. 130 pages. McDonald and Woodward Publishing Co.: 1986. .

External links

 Criel Mound
 The Kanawha Valley and its Prehistoric People
 Mounds & Mound Builders
 The South Charleston Museum

Archaeological sites on the National Register of Historic Places in West Virginia
Adena culture
Mounds in West Virginia
National Register of Historic Places in Kanawha County, West Virginia
Protected areas of Kanawha County, West Virginia
Archaeological sites in West Virginia
1880s archaeological discoveries
1st-millennium BC establishments in the Adena culture
South Charleston, West Virginia
Municipal parks in West Virginia
Parks on the National Register of Historic Places in West Virginia